Punnayur is a Panchayath in Thrissur district in the state of Kerala, India.This village has coastal area, Mannalamkunnu Beach is one of tourist destination in Trissur District . The office, co-op bank and Punnayur Village are located in Edakkara. Edakkara is one of the small area of Punnnayur Panchayth, Edakkazhiyur, Agalad, Kuzhingara, Aviyur Mannalamkunnu and Punnayur are the other places. Punnayur is located 35 km from Thrissur railway station, 12 km from Guruvayoor railway station, and 90 km from Kochi International Airport. Edakkara is very close to NH 17, (Ponnani- Chavakkad).

India's largest Public Aquarium, Marine World is now at Panchavadi Beach Edakkazhiyoor.

Demographics
 India census, Punnayur had a population of 17547 with 8198 males and 9349 females.

References

Villages in Thrissur district